Scranton is an unincorporated community in Hyde County, North Carolina, United States. Scranton has a post office with ZIP code 27875.

References

Unincorporated communities in Hyde County, North Carolina
Unincorporated communities in North Carolina